Caucasia may refer to:
Caucasus, geographic region between the Black and Caspian Seas.
Caucasia, Antioquia, a municipality in Colombia
Caucasia (novel), a 1998 book by Danzy Senna
Caucasia (film), a 2007 Azerbaijani film directed by Farid Gumbatov

See also
Caucasus (disambiguation)
Caucasian (disambiguation)
Kavkazsky (disambiguation)